Kalinovka is a rural locality (a selo) in Romnensky Selsoviet of Romnensky District, Amur Oblast, Russia. The population was 192 as of 2018. There are 4 streets.

Geography 
Kalinovka is located 9 km southeast of Romny (the district's administrative centre) by road. Romny is the nearest rural locality.

References 

Rural localities in Romnensky District